Idiopathic scrotal calcinosis  is a cutaneous condition characterized by calcification of the skin resulting from the deposition of calcium and phosphorus occurring on the scrotum. However, the levels of calcium and phosphate in the blood are normal. Idiopathic scrotal calcinosis typically affects young males, with an onset between adolescence and early adulthood. The scrotal calcinosis appears, without any symptoms, as yellowish nodules that range in size from 1 mm to several centimeters.

Presentation
 Single or multiple hard, marble-like nodules of varying size affecting scrotal skin.
 Nodules vary in size from a few millimeters to a few centimeters. 
 Usually start to appear in childhood or early adult life
 Over time, nodules increase in number and size
 Nodules may break down and discharge chalky material
 Rarely, lesions may be polypoid
 Usually asymptomatic

Etiology
The cause is not well defined. Originally considered idiopathic condition. Now accepted that majority of cases develop from dystrophic calcification of cyst contents.

Diagnostic 
 Clinically Relevant Pathologic Features

 Lesions slowly progress throughout life
 They slowly increase in number and size
 Nodules are mobile and do not attach to underlying structures
Pathologic Interpretation Pearls
 Globular and granular purple deposits within dermis surrounded by giant cell granulomatous reaction
 Sometimes remnants of cystic lesion can be identified
 Very distinctive appearance with almost no histologic differential diagnosis.

Treatment
Treatment may involve surgery, which is currently the only recommended intervention. Surgery should include the removal of even small nodules, to prevent the recurrence of the scrotal calcinosis.

Prognosis
 Benign condition

 Slow progression throughout life

 Lesions remain discrete and do not become confluent

Epidemiology
 Incidence: uncommon
 Age: children and young adults

History
Scrotal calcinosis was first described in 1883 by Lewinski.

See also 
 Calcinosis cutis
 Skin lesion
 List of cutaneous conditions

References 

Skin conditions resulting from errors in metabolism
Scrotum